Lotus Lantern is a Chinese animated feature film based on the Chinese fairy tale, The Magic Lotus Lantern, produced by Shanghai Animation Film Studio.

Plot
The story is based on the traditional Chinese folklore about a boy named Chenxiang. His mother, Sanshengmu, is a goddess and his father, Liu Yanchang, was a mortal. Since their marriage was forbidden, his maternal uncle, Erlang Shen, who was a god, punishes them by killing Liu Yanchang. Sanshengmu escapes and gives birth, but Chen Xiang grows up without knowledge of his ancestry. Sanshengmu possesses a magical Lotus Lantern whose light can scare away evil. When Erlang Shen, a strict and powerful god, kidnaps Chen Xiang, Sanshengmu fights to save him.

Unfortunately, Erlang Shen is victorious and Chen Xiang is forced to live in his palace on the sacred mountains. Erlang Shen then imprisons Sanshengmu beneath a mountain for her crimes. Although he is quite young, Chen Xiang manages to escape from the palace, taking the magical lotus lantern that Sanshengmu lost during the battle.

After surviving adventures with many beloved characters of Chinese mythology, Chen Xiang finally matures into a courageous young man who must battle Erlang Shen to win Sanshengmu's freedom and fall in love at the same time.

Main characters
 Chenxiang: Half-god boy. His mother is a goddess and his father is a mortal. He gets through tons of adventures to win his mother's freedom from his uncle Er langshen.
 Sanshengmu: Powerful Goddess who possesses a magical lotus lantern. She fell in love with a mortal and gave birth to Chenxiang. For which she is imprisoned beneath Hua Mountain.
 Er langshen: Er-lang Shen may be a deified version of several semi-mythical folk heroes who help regulate China's torrential floods, dating variously from the Qin, Sui and Jin dynasties. A later Buddhist source identify him as the second son of the Northern Heavenly King Vaishravana.

Background
The production took four years and required over 150,000 animations cels and over 2,000 painted backgrounds.  It was the most popular film in China in 1999 and influenced China's animation a lot which later makes a great difference to the world

Home media
Released in 2004, it contains English- and Japanese-language soundtracks along with the original Mandarin dialogue.

See also
 List of animated feature films

References

External links
 Official Site of "Shanghai Animation Film Studio"
 China Daily
 La Trobe University
 

Chinese animated films
1999 films
1990s Mandarin-language films
1999 animated films